Chlenias is a genus of moths in the family Geometridae.

Species
 Chlenias banksiaria (Le Guillou, 1841)
 Chlenias basichorda Turner, 1919
 Chlenias belophora (Turner, 1919)
 Chlenias cyclosticha Lower, 1915
 Chlenias gonosema Lower, 1893
 Chlenias inkata Tindale, 1961
 Chlenias macrochorda Turner, 1919
 Chlenias nodosus (Swinhoe, 1892)
 Chlenias ochrocrana Turner, 1947
 Chlenias pini Tindale, [1929]
 Chlenias seminigra Rosenstock, 1885
 Chlenias serina Lower, 1900
 Chlenias stenosticha Turner, 1919
 Chlenias zonaea Guest, 1887

References
 Chlenias at Markku Savela's Lepidoptera and Some Other Life Forms
 Natural History Museum Lepidoptera genus database

Ennominae
Geometridae genera